The 2018 Nashville mayoral special election took place on May 24, 2018, and elected the mayor of the Metropolitan Government of Nashville and Davidson County. David Briley, a Democrat who became interim mayor after the resignation of Megan Barry, won outright without a runoff election.

Former Mayor Megan Barry resigned on March 6, 2018, and the Davidson County Election Commission scheduled an election for August 2, 2018 to coincide with the state primary elections, school board elections and the election of several other municipal officials. However, mayoral candidate Ludye Wallace sued on the basis of state law (T.C.A. § 2-14-102) and a 2007 Metropolitan government charter amendment, both requiring an earlier election if the next general metropolitan election was more than twelve months away. The Tennessee Supreme Court agreed with Wallace's argument, unanimously ordering a mayoral election between May 21 and May 25.

Early voting was scheduled from May 4 to May 19. The election is officially nonpartisan. If no candidate had won a majority of the vote, a runoff would have been held on June 28 between the top two finishers.

Candidates
Fourteen candidates nominated for the mayoral election. David Briley was the sole candidate in support of Nashville's transit plan, which was decided in a referendum on May 1. Nashville voters overwhelmingly rejected the plan, by about a 2–1 margin.

Declared
 Carlin J. Alford
 David Briley
 Ralph Bristol
 Jeff Obafemi Carr
 Julia Clark-Johnson
 Roy Dale
 Erica Gilmore
 Albert Hacker
 David L. Hiland
 Harold Love
 Jeffrey A. Napier
 Jon Sewell
 Carol M. Swain
 Ludye N. Wallace

Results

References

2018 Tennessee elections
2018 United States mayoral elections
2018
Nashville 2018
Nashville 2018
May 2018 events in the United States